The Rural Municipality of Arm River No. 252 is a rural municipality (RM) in the Canadian province of Saskatchewan within Census Division No. 11 and  Division No. 5. It is located along Highway 11 between Saskatoon and Regina.

History 
The RM of Girvin No. 252 was originally incorporated as a rural municipality on December 13, 1909. Its name was changed to the RM of Arm River No. 252 on June 29, 1912.

Geography

Communities and localities 
The following urban municipalities are surrounded by the RM.

Towns
Davidson

The following unincorporated communities are within the RM.

Localities
Girvin (dissolved as a village, December 19, 2005)

Demographics 

Government 
The RM of Arm River No. 252 is governed by an elected municipal council and an appointed administrator that meets on the second Tuesday of every month. The reeve of the RM is Wayne Obrigewitsch while its administrator is Yvonne (Bonny) Goodsman. The RM's office is located in Davidson.

Transportation 
Rail
Regina Branch C.N.R—serves Bethune, Findlater, Chamberlain, Aylesbury, Craik, Girvin, Davidson, Bladworth, Kenaston, Strong

Roads
Highway 11—serves Girvin, Saskatchewan and Davidson, Saskatchewan
Highway 747—serves Davidson, Saskatchewan East-west
Highway 653—serves Davidson, Saskatchewan
Highway 749—serves Girvin, Saskatchewan

See also 
List of rural municipalities in Saskatchewan

References

External links 

A
Division No. 11, Saskatchewan